Dean State Forest is a state forest in Lawrence County, Ohio, United States.

References

External links
 U.S. Geological Survey Map at the U.S. Geological Survey Map Website. Retrieved December 25th, 2022.

Ohio state forests
Protected areas of Lawrence County, Ohio